Leucospilapteryx venustella is a moth of the family Gracillariidae. It is known from Canada (Québec) and the United States (the Atlantic states, Maine, Michigan, Missouri, Ohio, Pennsylvania, Vermont, Maryland and Kentucky).

The wingspan is about 6 mm.

The larvae feed on Ageratina ageratoides, Ageratina altissima and Eupatorium urticifolium. They mine the leaves of their host plant. The mine has the form of a large, tentiform mine on the underside of the leaf. When the larva finishes feeding, it leaves the mine and pupates inside a small cocoon.

References

Acrocercopinae
Moths described in 1860